Dasyophthalma creusa is a butterfly of the family Nymphalidae. It is found in Brazil, from Bahia to Rio Grande do Sul.

The larvae feed on Bactris species, Geonoma schottlana and Astrocaryum aculeatum or Astrocaryum vulgare.

Subspecies
Dasyophthalma creusa creusa (Brazil)
Dasyophthalma creusa baronesa Stichel, 1904 (Brazil: Espírito Santo)

References

Butterflies described in 1821
Morphinae
Fauna of Brazil
Nymphalidae of South America